The Swimming Tournament at the 1983 Pan American Games took place in Caracas, Venezuela from August 17 to August 22, 1983.

Three world records were broken at this edition of the Games, all by U.S. swimmers.

Men’s events

Women’s events

Medal table

References
 Hickoksports
 Results
 Folha Online
 USA Swimming

 
Swimming at the Pan American Games
Pan American Games
Events at the 1983 Pan American Games